The 1970 Grote Prijs Jef Scherens was the seventh edition of the Grote Prijs Jef Scherens cycle race and was held on 20 September 1970. The race started and finished in Leuven. The race was won by Frans Verbeeck.

General classification

References

1970
1970 in road cycling
1970 in Belgian sport